Pierre Reynald Gagne (born June 5, 1940) is a Canadian former professional ice hockey left winger. He played 2 games in the National Hockey League with the Boston Bruins during the 1959–60 season. The rest of his career, which lasted from 1960 to 1970, was spent in various minor leagues.

Playing career
Born in North Bay, Ontario, Gagne played two games for the Boston Bruins during the 1959–60 season, on March 19, 1960 against the Montreal Canadiens, and March 20 against the Chicago Black Hawks. He later moved to the Eastern Hockey League for the Clinton Comets and the New York Rovers. He played one game in the Eastern Professional Hockey League for the North Bay Trappers before moving to the International Hockey League with the Fort Wayne Komets.

Gagne moved on to play for the University of Ottawa and the Quebec senior league before moving to the Providence Reds of the American Hockey League for three years.  He then returned to the EHL with the Nashville Dixie Flyers. He spent the final two years of his career playing for Dalhousie University before retiring.

Personal life
Gagne is the father of Bill Gagne.

Career statistics

Regular season and playoffs

External links

1940 births
Living people
Barrie Flyers players
Boston Bruins players
Canadian expatriate ice hockey players in the United States
Canadian ice hockey left wingers
Clinton Comets players
Fort Wayne Komets players
Franco-Ontarian people
Ice hockey people from Ontario
Nashville Dixie Flyers players
New York Rovers players
North Bay Trappers (EPHL) players
Providence Reds players
Sportspeople from North Bay, Ontario